Winnicki (feminine: Winnicka, plural: Winniccy) is a surname. It may refer to:

 Innocenty Winnicki (1654–1700), Ukrainian bishop
 Jacek Winnicki (born 1967), Polish basketball coach
 Lucyna Winnicka (1928–2013), Polish actress
 Robert Winnicki (born 1985), Polish politician
 Tomasz Winnicki (chemist) (born 1934), Polish chemist
 Tomasz Winnicki (political activist) (born 1975), Canadian white supremacist

See also
 

Polish-language surnames